In chemistry, the mole map is a graphical representation of an algorithm that compares molar mass, number of particles per mole, and factors from balanced equations or other formulae.

Stoichiometry